Executive Order 13986, officially titled Ensuring a Lawful and Accurate Enumeration and Apportionment Pursuant to the Decennial Census, is the second executive order signed by U.S. President Joe Biden on January 20, 2021. The order reverses Executive Order 13880 and other Trump administration policies that had excluded non-citizens from the census count for the 2020 census. Executive Order 13986 requires non-citizens to be counted in the 2020 census, both for the purposes of enumeration and determining congressional apportionment.

Provisions 
The order is to discontinue citizenship tabulations at the city-block level using 2020 census data with administrative records.

Effects 
Non-citizens, whether legal or illegal, are not to be excluded from numbers of persons used for apportioning congressional seats among the states.

See also 
 List of executive actions by Joe Biden
2020 United States census

References

External links 
 US Presidential Actions
 Federal Register
Executive Order on Ensuring a Lawful and Accurate Enumeration and Apportionment Pursuant to the Decennial Census

2021 in American law
Executive orders of Joe Biden
January 2021 events in the United States